The 2001 Iowa Hawkeyes football team represented the University of Iowa and the Iowa Hawkeyes football program during the 2001 NCAA Division I-A football season.  Coached by Kirk Ferentz, the Hawkeyes played their home games at Kinnick Stadium in Iowa City, Iowa.

Leading up to the season

Previous season
Iowa opened the 2000 season with five straight losses, adding to a losing streak that totaled 13 games when the Hawkeyes lost to Indiana on September 30, 2000.  However, the streak came to an end a week later, when the Hawks defeated Michigan State, 21–16, giving Ferentz his first ever Big Ten win as head coach at Iowa.  Following a three-game losing streak, the Hawkeyes traveled to State College, Pennsylvania, for a game against Penn State.  The Hawks won the game, 26–23, and followed it up the next week with another win, this time over Northwestern.  The 27–17 victory gave Iowa a two-game winning streak, something that had not occurred for the Hawkeyes since the 1997 season.  Iowa finished the season with a 27–24 loss on November 18, 2000, against Minnesota.

Season outlook
2001 was marked as a potential turning point for the Hawkeyes, a year in which a bowl berth was entirely possible.  The Hawks returned two potential starters at quarterback in Kyle McCann and Jon Beutjer, and even received playing time from junior college transfer Brad Banks during the season.  Ladell Betts and Kahlil Hill came back for their senior seasons at the running back and wide receiver positions respectively.  Hill would go on win the Mosi Tatupu Award following the completion of the season.

On defense, the Hawkeyes looked to improve on their rushing defense numbers from the previous season.  In 2000, Iowa gave up 194.3 yards rushing, ninth in the Big Ten.  Aaron Kampman returned for his senior season on the defensive line, while fellow senior Mike Dolezal looked to replace LeVar Woods and Derrick Davison at linebacker.  Iowa's passing defense in 2000 allowed 247 yards passing a game, tenth in the Big Ten.  It was thought that added experience in that area would help improve that aspect of Iowa's defense.

The special teams returned Hill and sophomore Nate Kaeding, who hit 14-of-22 field goals and 20-of-20 extra points during his freshman season. In 2000, Hill finished second in the Big Ten with a 27.2-yard kickoff return average. Hill was also named to the first-team all-Big Ten team by the Sporting News for his 2000 performances.

Season

Schedule
Iowa's schedule did not include Big Ten teams Ohio State and Illinois in 2001.

Roster
The following is the roster from Iowa's 2001 season.

Game summaries

Kent State 

Sources: Scoring Summary

Opening the season on September 1, 2001, the Hawkeyes defeated the Kent State Golden Flashes, 51–0, in front of 56,091 fans at Kinnick Stadium.  The win was Iowa's first in a season opener under Ferentz, and it improved the Hawkeyes' record in season openers to 80–31–2.

On offense, Betts ran for 99 yards, while fellow running back Aaron Greving scored three touchdowns.  In total, Iowa ran for 331 yards, which compared favorably to the 113 yards for Kent State.  Jeremy Allen and Fred Russell also contributed, with 73 and 46 rushing yards respectively.  Allen also scored the first touchdown of his career during the game, on a 14-yard run during the first quarter.  Defensively, the Hawkeyes held Kent State to 13 first downs and 203 total offensive yards.  Iowa held the Golden Flashes to 90 yards passing; Kent State quarterback Jeff Valentino completed 3 of his 13 passes for 35 yards before being taken out of the game.  McCann and Banks threw for 165 and 71 yards respectively, while Dallas Clark led the Hawks in receiving, with five catches for 84 yards.  The loss was Kent State's sixth straight, dating back to the previous season.

For Iowa, the win capped a week in which Beutjer, a possible starter at quarterback, left the team.  Beutjer cited feeling "betrayed" by Iowa coaches, and Iowa player Bruce Nelson said that it would not "disrupt what we've got going."  Following the game, Ferentz noted that practice on the Thursday before the game was the best in his tenure at Iowa, while Kent State head coach Dean Pees expressed disappointment in his team's performance.  The next week, Kent State ended their six-game losing streak with a 38–17 victory over Bucknell.

Miami University 

Sources: Box Score and Game Recap

Penn State

Purdue

Michigan State

Indiana 

    
    
    
    
    
    
    
    
    
    

Ladell Betts ran for 172 yards and a touchdown, and Kahlil Hill had 93 yards receiving and two touchdowns in the Hawkeye victory over Indiana.

Michigan

Wisconsin

Northwestern 

Source: Box Score and Game Recap

Minnesota 

    
    
    
    
    
    
    
    
    
    

The Hawkeyes closed out their home schedule at 5–1 by blasting Minnesota. Iowa led 21–0 after the first quarter, 28–3 at half, and 42–10 after three quarters before cruising to the 18 point win. Kyle McCann threw 3 TD passes and ran for a TD.

After losing three straight in the series, this was the first of five consecutive wins for the Hawks over the Gophers.

Iowa State 

    
    
    
    
    

The annual battle for the Cy-Hawk Trophy was scheduled originally for September 15, but due to the September 11 attacks, it was postponed or canceled like all sporting events planned for that weekend. The game was rescheduled for November 24, which turned out to be a natural fit since many other major rivalries were played that weekend.

The Cyclones scored a touchdown in each of the first two quarters to head into halftime with a 14–0 lead. Iowa finally responded in the third quarter with two touchdowns from Ladell Betts, who also rushed for 150 yards on the day.

The final scoring play of the game came early in the fourth quarter, with Tony Yelk kicking a 32-yard field goal to put the Cyclones up 17–14. An interception by Adam Runk with 1:37 remaining sealed the game for the Cyclones.

Alamo Bowl 

Sources: Box score

    
    
    
    
    
    
    
    
    

Backup RB Aaron Greving ran for 115 yards and a touchdown and Nate Kaeding kicked four field goals, including the game-winner from 47 yards with 44 seconds remaining. The Hawkeyes earned their first bowl win under Kirk Ferentz and first since shutting out Texas Tech in the 1996 Alamo Bowl. The victory served as a springboard for the memorable 2002 season.

Awards and honors

Team players in the 2002 NFL Draft

References

General

References

Iowa
Iowa Hawkeyes football seasons
Alamo Bowl champion seasons
Iowa Hawkeyes football